FMR may refer to:
 FMR (chemotherapy), a chemotherapy regimen
 Favorite Music Radio, a Philippine radio network owned by Philippine Collective Media Corporation
 Federal Management Regulation in the United States Code of Federal Regulations
 Ferromagnetic resonance
 Festival Mushroom Records, a defunct Australian record label 
 Fidelity Management and Research, an American investment management company
 Fine Music Radio, broadcasting in Cape Town, South Africa
 FMR Records, an English record label
 FMR Magazine, an art periodical published by the eponymous Franco Maria Ricci
 Francisco Martins Rodrigues, Portuguese communist author
 Front mid-engine, rear-wheel-drive layout
 Fujitsu FMR, a Japanese computer architecture
 Les Fusiliers Mont-Royal, a Canadian reserve infantry unit
 Mexican Rugby Federation
 Monegasque Rugby Federation
 Falmer railway station, a railway station in Sussex, England